Pennoyer School District 79 is a school district headquartered in Norridge, Illinois. It operates the K-8 school Pennoyer School.

In addition to Norridge it also serves Harwood Heights and Norwood Park Township.

Kristin Kopta of Arlington Heights became the superintendent on July 1, 2016.

In 2018 the district had a referendum on whether it should build a new $25 million facility. 66.12% voted against and 33.88% voted in favor as indicated by unofficial tallies.

References

External links
 Pennoyer School District 79

School districts in Cook County, Illinois